Either Domin Jiménez Rodríguez (born 30 March 2001) is a Mexican professional footballer who plays as a midfielder for León.

Career statistics

Club

Notes

References

External links
 

Living people
2001 births
Footballers from Zacatecas
Association football midfielders
Club León footballers
Liga MX players
Mexican footballers